Neil McPherson Donahue is an American atmospheric chemist. He is the Thomas Lord Professor of Chemical Engineering, Chemistry, Engineering and Public Policy at Carnegie Mellon University and directs the school's Steinbrenner Institute for Environmental Education and Research. He is a highly cited researcher.

Early life and education 
Donahue is from Pittsburgh, Pennsylvania. His father, Thomas Michael Donahue, was a prominent space scientist who taught at the University of Pittsburgh and later the University of Michigan.

Donahue attended Brown University, where he received a Bachelor of Science degree in physics in 1985. At Brown, Donahue and his friends participated in environmental activism. Donahue attended the Massachusetts Institute of Technology for doctoral studies, graduating with a Ph.D. in meteorology in 1991.

Career 
Donahue completed postdoctoral work at Harvard University and began teaching at Carnegie Mellon in 2000. In 2017, Donahue received the Gustavus John Esselen Award for Chemistry in the Public Interest from the Northeastern Section of the American Chemical Society.

In 2020, Donahue was announced as the first editor-in-chief of Environmental Science: Atmospheres.

References

External links 

 

Atmospheric chemists
21st-century American chemists
Brown University alumni
Massachusetts Institute of Technology alumni
Carnegie Mellon University faculty
Year of birth missing (living people)
Living people